Luke Rawson (born 25 March 2001) is an English footballer who plays as a forward for Bradford (Park Avenue).

Career

Chesterfield
Rawson played for Chesterfield's youth team, hitting headlines when he scored for the team's reserves as a 16-year-old in 2017. He made his senior debut for the 'Spireites' in their final EFL League Two game of the 2017–18 season while still a first-year scholar, coming off the bench as an 82nd minute substitute for captain Drew Talbot.

On 14 October 2019, Rawson joined Brighouse Town on loan until January 2020. On 31 January 2020, he was then loaned out to Handsworth until 28 April 2020.

On 12 December 2020, Rawson joined National League North side Alfreton Town on loan for a month On 19 January, Rawson joined fellow National League North side Bradford (Park Avenue) on a five-week loan deal.

Bradford (Park Avenue)
On 2 August 2021, Rawson returned to National League North side Bradford (Park Avenue), this time on a permanent deal following his release from Chesterfield. On 28 January 2022, he was sent out again to Sheffield, dropping down two divisions to play in the Northern Premier League Division One East for a month-long loan.

Career statistics

References

Living people
2001 births
English footballers
Chesterfield F.C. players
Matlock Town F.C. players
Sheffield F.C. players
Brighouse Town F.C. players
Handsworth F.C. players
Alfreton Town F.C. players
Bradford (Park Avenue) A.F.C. players
English Football League players
National League (English football) players
Northern Premier League players
Northern Counties East Football League players
Association football forwards